Lease Wife is a 2006 drama film directed by Lu Xuechang, and is the story of a man who pays a prostitute to pretend to be his wife when he goes back to his village to visit his family.  It is also known as The Contract.

Lease Wife is Lu's fourth feature film and stars Li Jiaxuan as the prostitute, Lily, and Pan Yueming as the businessman, Guo Jiaju, who hires her.

References

External links

Lease Wife at the Chinese Movie Database

2006 films
2006 drama films
Chinese drama films
2000s Mandarin-language films
Films directed by Lu Xuechang